Aegomorphus ridleyi is a species of beetle in the family Cerambycidae. It was described by Waterhouse in 1894.

References

Aegomorphus
Beetles described in 1894